Pholidoptera is a genus of bush-crickets belonging to the subfamily Tettigoniinae and the type genus of the tribe Pholidopterini.

List of species

 Pholidoptera aptera (Fabricius, 1793) - alpine dark bush-cricket
 Pholidoptera brevicollis (A. Costa, 1882)
 Pholidoptera brevipes Ramme, 1939
 Pholidoptera brunneri (Targioni-Tozzetti, 1881)
 Pholidoptera bureschi Maran, 1957
 Pholidoptera caucasica (Fischer von Waldheim, 1846)
 Pholidoptera dalmatica (H. A. Krauss, 1879) - Dalmatian dark bush-cricket
 Pholidoptera dalmatina Maran, 1953
 Pholidoptera distincta (Uvarov, 1921)
 Pholidoptera ebneri Ramme, 1931 - Ebner's dark bush-cricket
 Pholidoptera fallax (Fischer von Waldheim, 1854)
 Pholidoptera femorata (Fieber, 1853) - large dark bush-cricket
 Pholidoptera frivaldskyi (Herman, 1871) - green dark bush-cricket
 Pholidoptera ganevi Harz, 1986
 Pholidoptera griseoaptera (De Geer, 1773) – dark bush-cricket- type species:  (as Locusta griseoaptera De Geer)
 Pholidoptera guichardi Karabag, 1961
 Pholidoptera ledereri (Fieber, 1861)
 Pholidoptera littoralis (Fieber, 1853) - littoral dark bush-cricket
 Pholidoptera lucasi F. Willemse, 1976
 Pholidoptera macedonica Ramme, 1928 - Macedonian dark bush-cricket
 Pholidoptera ornata (Nedelkov, 1907)
 Pholidoptera persica Chopard, 1921
 Pholidoptera pontica (Retowski, 1888)
 Pholidoptera pustulipes (Fischer von Waldheim, 1846)
 Pholidoptera satunini (Uvarov, 1916)
 Pholidoptera stankoi Karaman, 1960 - Stanko's dark bush-cricket
 Pholidoptera tartarus (Saussure, 1874)
 Pholidoptera transsylvanica (Fischer von Waldheim, 1853) - Transylvanian dark bush-cricket

References

Tettigoniinae
Tettigoniidae genera
Orthoptera of Europe